Parthenius IV (? – after 1685) was 5-time Ecumenical Patriarch of Constantinople (1657–1659, 1665–1667, 1671, 1675–1676, 1684–1685)

Life
Little is known of his early life. He was born in the first half of the seventeenth century, probably in Adrianople. He is also referred to as Mogilalos or Choumchoumis. He became known when he was elected Metropolitan of Prousa (Bursa in modern Turkey) in January 1655. While metropolitan of Prousa he took care of the restoration and decoration of the Church of St. George, which became the cathedral of the city of Prousa.

He became Patriarch of Constantinople for the first time on May 1, 1657 and remained patriarch until June 1662 when he was deposed and returned to his old see. However, he remained there for only a short time before leaving the Diocese of Prousa and settling at Wallachia. From Wallachia he returned to Constantinople to become patriarch again on October 21, 1665. In September 1667, he was deposed from the patriarchal throne a second time and exiled to Tenedos. A few months later he was recalled and was appointed the Metropolitan of Proilabos, before he settled at Adrianople and becoming the Metropolitan of Tirnovo “eis zoarkeian” (i.e. without pastoral obligations).

In March 1671, Parthenius became patriarch of Constantinople for a third time, after paying 20,000 florins. He was patriarch for about a half year, until October 1671, when he was exiled to Cyprus. Later he was allowed to leave exile, and he returned to Adrianople. Parthenius became patriarch for the fourth time on January 1, 1675 with a term lasting until October 24, 1676. He served a fifth term as patriarch of Constantinople from 1684 to 1685, before he was retired as the “eis zoarkeian” metropolitan of Anchialos.

The date that  Parthenius died is unknown, but it probably was late in the seventeenth century, in Adrianople.

Sources

Metropolitans of Bursa
Metropolitans of Brăila
Metropolitans of Anchialos
Metropolitans of Tarnovo
17th-century Ecumenical Patriarchs of Constantinople